is a railway station on the Hokuriku Main Line in the city of Hakusan, Ishikawa, Japan, operated by West Japan Railway Company (JR West).

Lines

Station layout
The station consists of one elevated side platform and one elevated island platform with the station building located underneath. The station has a Midori no Madoguchi staffed ticket office.

Platforms

History
Mattō Station opened on 1 April 1898. With the privatization of Japanese National Railways (JNR) on 1 April 1987, the station came under the control of JR West.

Passenger statistics
In fiscal 2015, the station was used by an average of 3,493 passengers daily (boarding passengers only).

Surrounding area
 Mattō Castle site
 Mattō High School
 Hakusan City Museum

Gallery

See also
 List of railway stations in Japan

References

External links

  

Stations of West Japan Railway Company
Railway stations in Ishikawa Prefecture
Railway stations in Japan opened in 1898
Hokuriku Main Line
Hakusan, Ishikawa